Christos Laskaris (Greek: Χρίστος Λάσκαρης, 1931 – December 11, 2008) was a Greek poet.

Laskaris was born in the village of Chavari in Elis, but moved to Patras as a child. He studied at the Pedagogical Academy of Tripoli, but did not become a teacher; instead, he worked his entire career in the insurance division of the Patras city bus authority. He was awarded the Cavafy International Award in Cairo in 2007.

Works

References

The first version of the article is translated and is based from the article at the Greek Wikipedia (el:Main Page)

1931 births
2008 deaths
People from Amaliada
Greek male poets
Poets from Achaea
20th-century Greek poets
20th-century Greek male writers